Sylvan "Duke" Jacobs was an American football player and coach.  He served as the head football coach at Fresno State College—now known as California State University, Fresno—from 1950 to 1951, compiling a record of 7–11–1. A native of Red Lion, Pennsylvania, Jacobs graduated from the University of Maryland in 1942. He attended Duke University as was injured during a practiced as a freshman.  After transferring to Maryland, Jacob practiced with the football team, but did not letter.  He played professional football in 1941 with Newark Bears of the American Association. In the spring of 1942, the Cleveland Rams of the National Football League (NFL) signed Jacobs to a contract, paying $150 per game for an 11-game season.

Head coaching record

College

References

Year of birth missing
Year of death missing
American football quarterbacks
Arkansas State Red Wolves football coaches
Brown Bears football coaches
Fresno State Bulldogs football coaches
George Washington Colonials football coaches
Oklahoma Sooners football coaches
High school football coaches in Washington, D.C.
Duke University alumni
University of Maryland, College Park alumni
People from Red Lion, Pennsylvania
Players of American football from Pennsylvania